Bechara El Khoury's Symphony, subtitled The Ruins of Beirut, was composed in 1985. It was the third of a series of works inspired in the ongoing Lebanese Civil War, being preceded by tone poem Lebanon in flames and a Requiem. It is composed of four movements, marked Drammatico, Misterioso, Poetico and Tragique. 

It was recorded for Naxos Records in 2002 by the National Symphony Orchestra of Ukraine, conducted by Vladimir Sirenko.

References
 Review at Gramophone, February 2003.

El Khoury
1985 compositions